The Reece Power Station is a conventional hydroelectric power station located in the West Coast region of Tasmania, Australia.

Technical details
Part of the Pieman River scheme that comprises four hydroelectric power stations, the Reece Power Station is the final station in the scheme, before the water runs out to sea. The power station is located aboveground at the foot of the rock-filled concrete faced Reece Dam (also called the Lower Pieman Dam) which forms Lake Pieman. Water from the lake is fed to the power station into two independent -long tunnels.

The station output, estimated to be  annually, is fed to TasNetworks' transmission grid via a 13.8 kV/220 kV Fuji generator transformer to the outdoor switchyard.

Etymology
Both the power station and the dam are named in honour of Eric Reece, the Premier of Tasmania between 1958 and 1969 and again between 1972 and 1975. Reece was a firm proponent of the Hydro-Electric Commission and the development of hydroelectricity in Tasmania.

See also 

 List of power stations in Tasmania

References

Further reading

Energy infrastructure completed in 1987
Hydroelectric power stations in Tasmania
Hydro Tasmania dams
Pieman River Power Development